Rose Kohn Goldsen (May 19, 1917 – August 2, 1985) was a professor of sociology at Cornell University and a pioneer in studying the effects of television and popular culture.

Prior to coming to Cornell, Goldsen worked for the Office of Radio Research, Columbia University Bureau of Applied Social Research. Goldsen came to Cornell as a research associate and felt that she encountered employment discrimination because she was a woman. In 1958, a faculty position opened up and she demanded to be considered, resulting in her appointment to the faculty.

Goldsen studied the psychological effects of television on individuals and society. Most notably, Goldsen was a very visible critic of a congressionally mandated government study of the impact of television violence on children. When the study reported no ill effects, Goldsen was able to document that the television industry had stacked the study and that its results were suspect. Goldsen explained the importance of her studying television by noting, "it is still possible to turn off the television set. It is not possible to turn off the television environment."

Goldsen broadcast a series of 11 lectures on sociology over an Ithaca, New York radio stations, February to May, 1974.

She also studied the attitudes of college students.

Goldsen was also active in Cornell University's governance and served on its University Senate.

Cornell Library's archive of new media art is named in her honor.

Books

References

External links
Rose Goldsen Archive of New Media Art website
 The ETC: Experimental Television Center Archive, Rose Goldsen Archive of New Media Art.

1917 births
1985 deaths
People from Newark, New Jersey
American sociologists
American women sociologists
Cornell University faculty
20th-century American women